Andrew Ayers Stanton (born December 3, 1965) is an American filmmaker and voice actor based at Pixar, which he joined in 1990. His film work includes co-writing and co-directing Pixar's A Bug's Life (1998), directing Finding Nemo (2003) and the sequel Finding Dory (2016), WALL-E (2008), and the live-action film, Disney's John Carter (2012), and co-writing all four Toy Story films (1995–2019) and Monsters, Inc. (2001).

Finding Nemo and WALL-E earned Stanton two Academy Awards for Best Animated Feature. He was also nominated for three Academy Awards for Best Original Screenplay, for Finding Nemo, WALL-E, and Toy Story (1995), and for an Academy Award for Best Adapted Screenplay for Toy Story 3 (2010). WALL-E has also been inducted into the National Film Registry. On television, Stanton directed two episodes of Stranger Things in 2017, an episode of Better Call Saul in 2018, and the final season premiere of Legion in 2019.

Early and personal life
Andrew Stanton was born on December 3, 1965, in Rockport, Massachusetts. His father, Ron Stanton, was the founder of a company that worked on radars for the United States Department of Defense. His mother, Gloria Stanton, pursued an acting career before becoming a homemaker. Both of Stanton's parents were natives of nearby Wellesley.

Stanton acted in high school and directed sketch comedy shot on Super 8 film. He portrayed Barnaby Tucker in a 1980 high school production of Hello, Dolly!, which later became a source of inspiration for WALL-E. Stanton studied for a year at the University of Hartford before transferring to the character animation program at the California Institute of the Arts. He received his Bachelor of Fine Arts from CalArts in 1987.

In 1989, Stanton married his high school sweetheart Julie, two weeks after she graduated from Georgetown University. The couple subsequently settled in Los Angeles, where they raised two children, Ben and Audrey. Stanton is a Christian.

Stanton revealed in 2012, that he was diagnosed with attention deficit hyperactivity disorder when he was in the middle of writing John Carter.

Stanton is an Arsenal F.C. fan, and included a scene mimicking their famous offside trap among other Arsenal references in John Carter.

Career

Stanton began his career in animation in the late 1980s. He worked as an animator for Kroyer Films, and one of his early gigs involved animating sperm for a sex-ed film with Martin Short. Stanton was one of several CalArts graduates hired by John Kricfalusi to work on Mighty Mouse: The New Adventures at Ralph Bakshi's studio.

After being rejected by Disney three times, Stanton was hired by Pixar's animation group in 1990 as its second animator (John Lasseter being the first) and ninth employee. Back then Pixar was not yet an animation studio, and their animation group was dedicated to making television commercials as a step towards their goal of making the first computer-animated feature.

Stanton, Lasseter and Pete Docter drafted the original treatment for Toy Story, which bore little resemblance with the eventually finished film. After production of the film was shut down in late November 1993 following a disastrous test screening, Stanton retreated into a windowless office and extensively reworked the script with help from Joss Whedon. The resulting screenplay was nominated at the Academy Awards for Best Original Screenplay, the first nomination in that category for an animated film.

Following Toy Story, Lasseter asked Stanton to help him direct and write Pixar's next feature A Bug's Life. Early in the film's production, the film had difficulty incorporating the circus bug's portion of the story and the main character (Flik's) portion of the story. In a day, Stanton was able to write a screenplay that tied both concepts together. In 1999, Stanton returned to write Toy Story 2, the critically acclaimed sequel to Toy Story, and also voiced Emperor Zurg. He would then go on to write Monsters, Inc.. Docter, the director of Monsters, Inc., would cite him many times as the originator of the idea that monsters generated screams to use to power their city.

Stanton made his solo directorial debut in 2003 with Finding Nemo. He took inspiration from his own role as a father and how he was overprotective of his son. Stanton directed, wrote and voiced Crush the sea turtle in the film. Just like Toy Story before it, Michael Eisner was not confident in the film and predicted it would fail. During this time Stanton and other Finding Nemo co-writer Bob Peterson developed the storytelling theory of "2+2", to not give the audience the full picture but rather halves and have them put the film together. The film turned out to be an enormous success becoming the highest-grossing film of 2003 and the highest grossing animated film of that time period, beating out The Lion King. He won his first Academy Award for the film in the category of Best Animated Feature, and his screenplay was nominated in the category of Best Original Screenplay.

Following his success with Finding Nemo, Stanton began work on his next film as director WALL-E. WALL-E was considered a huge risk for both Pixar and Disney, considering how experimental the film sounded. Stanton nevertheless had confidence in the film and that audiences wouldn't be bored by the dialogue-less first thirty minutes, but rather enamored by it. Upon release the film was a huge critical and financial success. Stanton won his second Academy Award for the film in the category of Best Animated Feature and once again his screenplay was nominated in the category of Best Original Screenplay.  In an interview with World Magazines Megan Basham, Stanton explained his singular vision for WALL-E: 

Stanton returned to write Toy Story 3 in 2010, alongside Michael Arndt. When he first pitched the scene of the toys in the incinerator both Lasseter and Lee Unkrich (the director of the film) teared up. Many employees at Pixar have pointed out how the release of the film happened to be somewhat consecutive to one of Stanton's children going to college. His screenplay was nominated for an Academy Award in the category of Best Adapted Screenplay. After the acquisition of Pixar by The Walt Disney Company in 2006, Stanton became the vice president of creativity at Pixar alongside fellow Pixar director Pete Docter. He is a member of the studio's coveted brain trust, and has executive produced and served as a creative and mentor-like voice on the following films: Ratatouille, Up, Brave, Monsters University, Inside Out, and The Good Dinosaur.

In 2012, Stanton made his live-action directing debut with Disney's John Carter. The film was based on Edgar Rice Burroughs' novel, A Princess of Mars. Upon release it received mixed reviews and was a box office failure.

Following John Carter, Stanton returned to Pixar to direct the sequel to 2003's Finding Nemo, Finding Dory. He came up with the concept upon watching a pre-screening of the 3D rerelease of the film and walking out of the theater worried about Dory. The film was released in 2016 and was a huge hit critically and financially, becoming the highest grossing animated film of that year. It was also critically well received, with critics calling it "a worthy successor to Nemo".

On February 10, 2017, it was revealed by Entertainment Weekly that Stanton was going to direct two episodes of the second season of Stranger Things. Since then Stanton has also directed an episode of Better Call Saul, and Legion.

Stanton was credited as a narrative guru on Ralph Breaks the Internet, helping director and former classmate Rich Moore construct the story following Walt Disney Animation Studios and Pixar Animation Studios former chief creative officer Lasseter's step down. He co-wrote Toy Story 4, which was released on June 21, 2019. Initially, when he pitched the idea to director Josh Cooley, Cooley was concerned feeling like Toy Story 3 was the perfect ending. Stanton reportedly told Cooley "Toy Story 3 was a good ending--but it's not the ending." He explained that it wasn't the ending of Woody's story but rather the ending of Woody's time with Andy. Stanton reportedly started writing Toy Story 4 in secret while the third film was still in production. 

He is currently the Vice President of Creativity at Pixar helping to ensure the company's creative output.

He has expressed interest in directing more live action films, stating that he wants to return "[b]ecause it's quicker and it's a little bit more of the opposite... It's the antithesis of animation. Animation you get to control everything, and it's awesome in that sense. But there's no spontaneity, and it takes a long time! And so there's high risk for the complete opposite reasons of live-action."

In 2020, it was announced that Stanton was in talks to direct and write Chairman Spaceman for Searchlight Pictures and Simon Kinberg's production label, Genre Films. The film is based on The New Yorker short story of the same name by Thomas Pierce. The film will mark Stanton's third venture into the Science-Fiction genre, following WALL-E and John Carter. Stanton has been quoted many times saying that science fiction is his favorite genre. Films like Star Wars, Blade Runner, Aliens, as well as Edgar Rice Burroughs' novel,  Princess of Mars, helped shape his interest in the genre. The same year, Stanton was attached to direct Revolver, a romantic comedy starring Maya Hawke and Ethan Hawke from a screenplay by Kate Trefry. In 2022, it was announced that Stanton would direct In the Blink of an Eye for Searchlight Pictures from a screenplay by Colby Day.

Filmography

Feature films

Short films

TV episodes and specials

Video games

Theme parks

Other credits
{| class="wikitable"
|-
! Year
! Title
! Role
|-
| 1997
| Geri's Game
| Very Special Thanks
|-
| 2000
| For the Birds
| Thanks
|-
| 2006
| Lifted
| rowspan="2"| Special Thanks
|-
| rowspan="2"| 2007
| Fog City Mavericks
|-
| The Pixar Story
| Himself; Very Special Thanks
|-
| 2010
| Finding Nico
| rowspan="2"| Special Thanks
|-
| rowspan="2"| 2014
| Lava
|-
| Toy Story That Time Forgot
| Extra Special Thanks
|-
| 2015
| Sanjay's Super Team
| Special Thanks
|-
| 2016
| Zootopia
| Creative Consultant
|-
| rowspan="3"| 2019
| Purl
| Kristen Lester's Story Trust
|-
| Frozen II
| rowspan="3"| Special Thanks
|-
| Spies in Disguise
|-
| 2021
| Encanto
|-
| 2022
| Beyond Infinity: Buzz and the Journey to 'Lightyear'''
| Himself 
|}

Collaborations (Acting)
Andrew Stanton has cast certain actors and crew members in more than one of the films he has directed.

Award and nominations

Academy Awards

Preservation
Two of Stanton's short films, A Story and Somewhere in the Arctic..., were preserved by the Academy Film Archive in 2012.

References

 Bibliography 

 

External links

 
 A Day in the Life of Andrew Stanton – The New York Times''
 
 "The clues to a great story" (TED2012)

1965 births
20th-century American male actors
21st-century American male actors
American animated film directors
American Christians
American film producers
American male film actors
American male screenwriters
American male voice actors
American people of Scotch-Irish descent
American storyboard artists
Animators from Massachusetts
Animation screenwriters
Annie Award winners
California Institute of the Arts alumni
Directors of Best Animated Feature Academy Award winners
Film directors from Massachusetts
Hugo Award-winning writers
Nebula Award winners
Living people
People from Rockport, Massachusetts
Pixar people
Science fiction film directors
Screenwriters from Massachusetts
Writers from Massachusetts
Sony Pictures Animation people